The Alta Valle Antrona Natural Park is a nature reserve in Piedmont, in Italy.

It is in the Ossola valley between an altitude of 500 and 3.656 m (Pizzo d'Andolla). Despite the mining activities carried out in the past, the natural vegetation and fauna have been preserved.

A great portion of the park adjoins Switzerland. It is managed by the Alpe Veglia and Alpe Devero Natural Park.

See also 
 CoEur - In the heart of European paths

References

External links

Official website
News about the park

Parks in Piedmont
Tourist attractions in Piedmont